Saki (written: 咲, 沙紀, 沙季, サキ, or さき) is a feminine Japanese given name. Notable people with the name include:

 Saki (born 1990), Japanese musician
 Saki Aibu (born 1985), Japanese actress
 Saki Fujita (born 1984), Japanese voice actress
 Saki Fukuda (born 1990), Japanese actress and singer
 Saki Hasemi, Japanese manga artist and writer
 Saki Hatsumi (born 1990), Japanese pornographic film actress
, Japanese women's basketball player
 Saki Hiwatari (born 1961), Japanese manga artist
 Saki Kagami (born 1985), Japanese actress and singer
 Saki Kumagai (born 1990), Japanese association footballer
 Saki Minemura (born 1990), Japanese volleyball player
, Japanese women's basketball player
 Saki Nakajima (voice actress) (born 1978), Japanese voice actress
 Saki Nakajima (singer) (born 1994), Japanese idol singer (Cute)
 Saki Ogawa (born 1996), Japanese idol singer (S/mileage)
 Saki Ooga (born 2000), a Japanese idol singer (Sakura Gakuin)
, Japanese shogi player
  (born 1985), a Japanese actress, gravure idol, and TV personality
, Japanese table tennis player
 Saki Shimizu (born 1991), Japanese idol singer (Berryz Kobo)
  (born 2000), a Japanese idol singer (Sakura Gakuin)
 Saki Takaoka (born 1972), Japanese actress
, Japanese sprinter
 Saki, the nickname of Masaki Liu, a California musician

Fictional characters
 Saki Akasaka, a personality of the character Kozue Aoba in the manga and anime series Mahoraba Heartful Days
 Saki Amamiya, the main character in the video game Sin and Punishment
 Saki Amano, a main character in the anime/manga series Kanamemo
 Saki Hanajima, a character in the manga and anime series Fruits Basket
 Saki Hyūga, a co-protagonist of Futari wa Pretty Cure Splash Star
 Saki Miyanaga, the main character in the manga and anime series Saki
 Saki Morimi, one of the main characters in the anime series Eden of the East
 Saki Nijino, a character in the video game Tokimeki Memorial: Forever with you
 Saki Nikaido, a character from the MAPPA idol anime series Zombie Land Saga
 Saki Omokane, one of the seven heroines in the quiz game/dating sim Quiz Nanairo Dreams
 Saki Royama, a main character from the 2008 Japanese tokusatsu television series Engine Sentai Go-onger
 Saki Tenjouin, a character in the manga and anime series To LOVE-Ru
 Saki Tsuzura, a character in the video game series Arcana Heart
 Oroku Saki or Shredder (Teenage Mutant Ninja Turtles), a villain in the Teenage Mutant Ninja Turtles stories
 Saki, a character from the hentai series Cool Devices
 Steel Angel Saki, a character from the manga and anime series Steel Angel Kurumi
 Saki, a minor recurring character from Grandia 1
 Saki Miyu, a character in the video game Yandere Simulator
 Saki Konishi, a character in the video game/anime Persona 4
 Saki Yoshida, the main character in the hentai manga Metamorphosis
 Saki Tenma, a character in the mobile game Project Sekai, member of the Leo/Need unit

Japanese feminine given names